The Samsung SPH-a503, known as The Drift, is a slider multimedia wireless mobile device, which comes in black or white. It is sold by Helio, a joint venture between Earthlink (a U.S.-based internet service provider) and SK Telecom (a South Korea-based CDMA mobile telecom). The Drift is the first to have Location-Based Services bundled with the device. The Drift comes loaded with a version of Google Maps that uses the device's GPS to locate the user on a map and the Buddy Beacon application that lets friends share their current location with each other via MapQuest. The Drift was added to Helio's line-up in November 2006.

References

External links 
 Product website

Helio (wireless carrier)
Personal digital assistants
A503
Mobile phones introduced in 2006